Toimi is a Finnish masculine given name that may refer to
Toimi Alatalo (1929–2014), Finnish cross-country skier 
Toimi Jarvi (1920–1977), American football player
Toimi Kankaanniemi (born 1950), Finnish politician 
Toimi Pitkänen (born 1928), Finnish rower

See also
Toimi, Minnesota, an unincorporated community in the United States

Finnish masculine given names